Colchester is a historic town located in Essex, England. It served as the first capital of Roman Britain and makes a claim to be the oldest town in Britain.

Colchester is represented in parliament by Will Quince MP of the Conservative Party. There is no overall control over Colchester Borough Council as of 2018.

Local political parties
Five national parties (Conservative, Labour, Liberal Democrats, the UK Independence Party and the Green Party) are represented locally by constituency or borough parties. Three of these have representation on the council (Conservative, Labour and Liberal Democrat). In addition, there are 3 Independents that form the Highwoods Independent Group on the council.

Colchester Borough Council

Colchester Borough Council is the local authority. Control of the borough council has been tightly contested between the Conservatives and a Progressive Alliance led by the Liberal Democrats and Labour in recent years. The political composition of the council (as of the 2021 election) is:

 Conservative – 23 seats
 Liberal Democrats – 12seats
 Labour – 11 seats
 Highwoods Independents – 3 seats
Green Party - 2 seats

Electoral wards

For the purposes for elections and local administration, Colchester is divided into electoral wards. Since 2016 there have been 17 wards.

 Berechurch 
Castle
Greenstead 
Highwoods
Lexden & Braiswick
Marks Tey 
Mersea & Pyefleet 
Mile End 
New Town & Christ Church 
Old Heath & The Hythe 
Prettygate 
Rural North 
Shrub End 
Stanway 
St. Johns & St. Annes 
Tiptree 
Wivenhoe

Leaders of the Council
2021-present Paul Dundas (Conservative)
2018–2021 Mark Cory (Liberal Democrat)
2015–2018 Paul Smith (Liberal Democrat)
2008-2015 Anne Turrell (Liberal Democrat)
2006-2008 Robert Davidson (Conservative)
2004-2006 John Jowers (Conservative)
2002-2004 Colin Sykes (Liberal Democrat)
2000-2002 Bill Frame (Liberal Democrat)

Mayor of Colchester

The current Mayor of Colchester is Councillor Robert Davidson (Conservative).

Parliamentary politics

Colchester was covered by two separate constituencies (Colchester North and Colchester South and Maldon) until the 1997 general election, when it returned to one seat of representation.

List of MPs for Colchester, Colchester North (N) and Colchester South and Maldon (S) constituencies (since 1910):
Laming Worthington-Evans (Conservative, 1910–1929)
Oswald Lewis (Conservative, 1929–1945)
Charles Smith (Labour, 1945–1950)
Cuthbert Alport (Conservative, 1950–1961)
Antony Buck (N-Conservative, 1961–1992)
John Wakeham (S-Conservative, 1979–1992)
Bernard Jenkin* (N-Conservative, 1992–1997)
John Whittingdale (S-Conservative, 1992–1997)
Sir Bob Russell (Liberal Democrat, 1997–2015)
Will Quince (Conservative, 2015–present)

*Jenkin also sat as an MP for North Essex (1997–2010) and Harwich and North Essex (2010–present)

References

External links
Colchester Borough Council, list of borough councillors
Colchester Conservative Association
Colchester Constituency Labour Party
Colchester Liberal Democrats
Colchester Green Party
Colchester UK Independence Party

 
Colchester Politics
Colchester Politics